Bassist is a musician who plays a bass instrument such as bass guitar, double bass, or keyboard bass.

Bass player may also refer to:

Bass Player (magazine), a magazine for bassists
Bass Player (album), a 2003 album by Rhombus